Tetrabutylammonium hexafluorophosphate is a salt with the formula NBu4PF6. It is a white powder that is used as an electrolyte in nonaqueous electrochemistry.  It is highly soluble in polar organic solvents such as acetone and acetonitrile.

The salt consists of a positively charged tetrabutylammonium, a quaternary ammonia cation and a weakly basic hexafluorophosphate anion.  These species are chemically inert, which allows the salt to serve as an inert electrolyte over a wide potential range. Given the sensitivity of electrochemical experiments, this salt is usually further purified, e.g., by recrystallization from aqueous or absolute ethanol.

References

Tetrabutylammonium salts
Hexafluorophosphates